Sir John Murray may refer to:

Sir John Murray, 8th Baronet (c. 1768 – 1827), British general
Sir John Murray of Broughton, 7th Baronet Stanhope (c. 1718 – 1777), Scottish Jacobite
Sir John Irvine Murray (1826–1902), Scottish general who raised the 14th Murray's Jat Lancers
Sir John Murray (oceanographer) (1841–1914), Scottish oceanographer
Sir John Macgregor Murray, 1st Baronet, Scottish army officer